The Minister of Health is the head of the Ministry of Health and a member of the Cabinet of Turkey. The current Minister of Health is Fahrettin Koca (independent), who has been in office since 10 July 2018.

See also
Ministry of Health (Turkey)

External links

References

Ministers of Health
Health
Ministers of Health